Ciro Di Corcia (born 4 July 1976) is an Italian boxer. He competed in the men's light middleweight event at the 2000 Summer Olympics.

References

External links
 

1976 births
Living people
Italian male boxers
Olympic boxers of Italy
Boxers at the 2000 Summer Olympics
Sportspeople from Foggia
Mediterranean Games silver medalists for Italy
Mediterranean Games medalists in boxing
Competitors at the 1997 Mediterranean Games
AIBA World Boxing Championships medalists
Light-middleweight boxers